Robert Ashley (died 1432/3), of Budbury by Bradford-on-Avon, Wiltshire, was an English politician.

He was a Member (MP) of the Parliament of England for Wiltshire in 1419.

References

Year of birth missing
1430s deaths
People from Wiltshire
English MPs 1419